The 1949 Claxton Shield (at the time known as the 1949 Australian Championship Series) was the tenth annual Claxton Shield, an Australian national baseball tournament. It was held in Melbourne, Victoria from 31 July to 7 August, and was won by Victoria for the third time overall, all in successive years. The other participants were South Australia, New South Wales and Western Australia.

Format
The 1949 edition of the Claxton Shield saw a new format introduced. Each of the four teams played a double round-robin schedule, meeting each other team twice. This ensured that each team would be guaranteed to play six games during the tournament. Two competition points were on offer in each game, with the points were awarded as follows:
 Win – two points
 Tie – one point
 Loss – no points
At the end of the round-robin games, if a team had an outright lead over all other teams, they would be declared the champions. If two teams were tied for the lead, they would then play in a championship game on the final day. If the championship game was not required, an Australian team would have been named after the round-robin games to play The Rest as an alternative, however given weather constraints this game was not played.

References

Bibliography
 

Claxton Shield
Claxton Shield
Claxton Shield
August 1949 sports events in Australia
July 1949 sports events in Australia